The 1992 European Curling Championships were held from 7 to 12 December at Dewars Rink in Perth, Scotland.

Germany's Andy Kapp rink won that country's third European championship, and the first of two in his career. On the women's side, Team Elisabet Johansson (later Gustafson) won Sweden's eighth championship and the first of four titles for her in her career.

Men's

A Tournament

Group A

Tiebreakers
 8-2 
 7-6

Playoffs

Women's

Group A

Tiebreaker
 9-2

Playoffs

References

External links

European Curling Championships, 1993
European Curling Championships, 1993
European Curling Championships
International curling competitions hosted by Scotland
Sport in Perth, Scotland
December 1992 sports events in the United Kingdom